Poimenesperus obliquus is a species of beetle in the family Cerambycidae. It was described by Per Olof Christopher Aurivillius in 1916. It is known from Cameroon.

References

Endemic fauna of Cameroon
obliquus
Beetles described in 1916